Taniela Rakuro is a Fijian rugby union player, currently playing for the . His preferred position is wing.

Early career
Rakuro is from Malomalo in Nadroga. He plays for Nadroga in the Skipper Cup.

Professional career
He was promoted to the main squad on a short-term deal ahead of the season in February 2023 and made his debut in Round 1 of the season against , scoring the winning try on debut, on what was the first occasion that he had left Fiji.

References

External links
itsrugby.co.uk Profile

Living people
Fijian rugby union players
Rugby union wings
Fijian Drua players
People from Nadroga-Navosa Province